Aaron Frankcomb (born 4 April 1985) is a professional squash player who represents Australia.

References

External links 
 
 

Australian male squash players
Living people
1985 births
Sportspeople from Hobart
Competitors at the 2009 World Games
20th-century Australian people
21st-century Australian people